The 1990 Individual Long Track World Championship was the 20th edition of the FIM speedway Individual Long Track World Championship. The event was held on 19 August 1990 at Herxheim in Germany which was West Germany at the time.

The world title was won by Simon Wigg of England for the third time.

Final Classification 

 E = eliminated (no further ride)
 f = fell
 ef = engine failure
 x = excluded

References 

1990
Speedway competitions in Germany
Sport in West Germany
Sports competitions in West Germany
Motor
Motor